The host protected area (HPA) is an area of a hard drive or solid-state drive that is not normally visible to an operating system. It was first introduced in the ATA-4 standard CXV (T13) in 2001.

How it works

The IDE controller has registers that contain data that can be queried using ATA commands. The data returned gives information about the drive attached to the controller. There are three ATA commands involved in creating and using a host protected area. The commands are:
 IDENTIFY DEVICE
 SET MAX ADDRESS
 READ NATIVE MAX ADDRESS

Operating systems use the IDENTIFY DEVICE command to find out the addressable space of a hard drive. The IDENTIFY DEVICE command queries a particular register on the IDE controller to establish the size of a drive.

This register however can be changed using the SET MAX ADDRESS ATA command. If the value in the register is set to less than the actual hard drive size then effectively a host protected area is created. It is protected because the OS will work with only the value in the register that is returned by the IDENTIFY DEVICE command and thus will normally be unable to address the parts of the drive that lie within the HPA.

The HPA is useful only if other software or firmware (e.g. BIOS or UEFI) is able to use it. Software and firmware that are able to use the HPA are referred to as 'HPA aware'. The ATA command that these entities use is called READ NATIVE MAX ADDRESS. This command accesses a register that contains the true size of the hard drive. To use the area, the controlling HPA-aware program changes the value of the register read by IDENTIFY DEVICE to that found in the register read by READ NATIVE MAX ADDRESS. When its operations are complete, the register read by IDENTIFY DEVICE is returned to its original fake value.

Use 

 At the time HPA was first implemented on hard-disk firmware, some BIOS had difficulty booting with large hard disks. An initial HPA could then be set (by some jumpers on the hard disk) to limit the number of cylinders to 4095 or 4096 so that the older BIOS would start. It was then the job of the bootloader to reset the HPA so that the operating system would see the full hard-disk storage space.
 HPA can be used by various booting and diagnostic utilities, normally in conjunction with the BIOS. An example of this implementation is the Phoenix FirstBIOS, which uses Boot Engineering Extension Record (BEER) and Protected Area Run Time Interface Extension Services (PARTIES). Another example is the Gujin installer which can install the bootloader in BEER, naming that pseudo-partition /dev/hda0 or /dev/sdb0; then only cold boots (from power-down) will succeed because warm boots (from Control-Alt-Delete) will not be able to read the HPA.
 Computer manufacturers may use the area to contain a preloaded OS for install and recovery purposes (instead of providing DVD or CD media).
 Dell notebooks hide Dell MediaDirect utility in HPA. IBM ThinkPad and LG notebooks hide system restore software in HPA.
 HPA is also used by various theft recovery and monitoring service vendors. For example, the laptop security firm CompuTrace use the HPA to load software that reports to their servers whenever the machine is booted on a network. HPA is useful to them because even when a stolen laptop has its hard drive formatted the HPA remains untouched.
 HPA can also be used to store data that is deemed illegal and is thus of interest to government and police computer forensics teams.
 Some vendor-specific external drive enclosures (e.g. Maxtor, owned by Seagate since 2006) are known to use HPA to limit the capacity of unknown replacement hard drives installed into the enclosure. When this occurs, the drive may appear to be limited in size (e.g. 128 GB), which can look like a BIOS or dynamic drive overlay (DDO) problem. In this case, one must use software utilities (see below) that use READ NATIVE MAX ADDRESS and SET MAX ADDRESS to change the drive's reported size back to its native size, and avoid using the external enclosure again with the affected drive.
 Some rootkits hide in the HPA to avoid being detected by anti-rootkit and antivirus software.
 Some NSA exploits use the HPA for application persistence.

Identification and manipulation 
Identification of HPA on a hard drive can be achieved by a number of tools and methods.

Note that the HPA feature can be hidden by DCO commands (documentation states only if the HPA is not in use), and can be "frozen" (until next power-down of the hard disk) or be password protected.

Identification tools

 ATATool by Data Synergy
 The Sleuth Kit (free, open software) by Brian Carrier (HPA identification is currently Linux-only.)
 EnCase by Guidance Software
 Forensic Toolkit by Access Data

Identification methods
The Windows program ATATool can detect an HPA. For instance, to see if the first disk has an HPA use the command:
 ATATOOL /INFO \\.\PhysicalDrive0

Using Linux, there are various ways to detect the existence of an HPA. Recent versions of Linux will print a message when the system is booting if an HPA is detected. For example:

 dmesg | less
 [...]
 hdb: Host Protected Area detected.
     current capacity is 12000 sectors (6 MB)
     native  capacity is 120103200 sectors (61492 MB)

The program hdparm (versions 8.0 and above) will detect an HPA on drive sdX when invoked with these parameters:
 hdparm -N /dev/sdX

For versions of hdparm below 8, one can compare the number of sectors output from 'hdparm -I' with the number of sectors reported for the hard drive model's published statistics.

Manipulation methods
The Windows program ATATool can be used to create a HPA. For instance, to create a 10GB HPA:
 ATATOOL /NONVOLATILEHPA /SETHPA:10GB \\.\PhysicalDrive1

The Linux program hdparm (version >= 8.0) will create an HPA when invoked with these parameters: (sdX: target drive, #: number of non-HPA visible sectors)
 hdparm -N p# /dev/sdX

See also
 Device Configuration Overlay (DCO)
 GUID Partition Table (GPT)
 Master boot record (MBR)

References

External links
 The Sleuth Kit
 International Journal of Digital Evidence
 Dublin City University Security & Forensics wiki
 Wiki Web For ThinkPad Users

AT Attachment
Computer forensics
Computer security procedures
Information technology audit